Êta Mundo Bom! (English title: The Good Side of Life!) is a Brazilian telenovela produced and broadcast by TV Globo. It premiered on 18 January 2016 in the 6 p.m. timeslot, replacing Além do Tempo and ended on 26 August 2016, being followed by Sol Nascente.

It is written by Walcyr Carrasco and directed by Jorge Fernando. Starring Sérgio Guizé, Flávia Alessandra, Débora Nascimento, Bianca Bin, Eriberto Leão, Elizabeth Savalla, Dhu Moraes, Rosi Campos, Marco Nanini, Miguel Rômulo and Ary Fontoura.

Set in the 1940s, Êta Mundo Bom! examines the life of Candinho (Sérgio Guizé), a young man who was separated from his mother at birth and lives in abject poverty in the fictitious countryside of Piracema. He moves to the city in search of his estranged rich mother (Eliane Giardini) who at the same time is looking for her. But there is an ambitious niece of the desperate mother, Sandra (Flávia Alessandra) who does everything in her power to keep the fortune for herself.

The telenovela also marks the return of Carrasco in the 6pm timeslot. It is also the most watched telenovela in that timeslot in nine years having recorded a viewership rating of 27 points.

Plot 
Candinho was separated from his mother immediately after birth and was raised by the couple Cunegundes and Quinzinho, owners of a farm in the interior of São Paulo in the 1920s. But when he grows up, Candinho he is turned into their employee in this House and later expelled by falling in love to their firstborn, Filomena.

Pancrácio, friend of the family and a mentor to Candinho, advises him to travel to the city in search for his biological mother, Anastáncia, that he had never met. Thus, Candinho travels with his inseparable donkey, Policarpo. On the other hand, Candinho's mother is millionaire widow who is also looking for his son (Candinho) in the capital. She counts on the help of detective Jack and her best friend Emma and Araújo, an attorney. But Anastáncia has no idea that her niece, Sandra, is doing everything possible to prevent her from finding Candinho. By doing so, she maintains favour of being the sole heiress. On Anastáncia's eyes, Sandra is an exemplary, cultured, sweet and generous but in reality, she is unscrupulous, greedy and selfish.

Candinho faces the most diverse situations to survive in the city. In addition to the incessant search of his mother, he is determined to fight for the love of Filomena that now lives in the city and is in relationship with the possessive, Ernesto. Ernesto, who always knew Filó convinces her to run away to the city, promising him the world but to Filó's surprise, her life turns upside-down. To make it worse, Ernesto stays with the money, hence Filomena starts working as a dancer and meets the mysterious Paulina and tormented by an overly ambitious dancer Diana.

Cast

Special participation

Soundtrack

Vol. 1

Vol. 2

Ratings 

On its premiere, Êta Mundo Bom! registered a viewership rating of 25.9 points in Greater São Paulo, while in Rio de Janeiro it registered 29 points, making it the most watched premiere at the timeslot since Araguaia (2010).

As of 6 July, the show had an accumulated viewership of 25.8 points.

Its highest ratings recorded since the first episode is 33 points in São Paulo and 36 points in Rio de Janeiro. On 27 July 2016, the telenovela also recorded a rating, for a 6 pm show, of 34.4, the largest viewership rating since O Profeta (2007).

References

External links 
  
 

2016 telenovelas
TV Globo telenovelas
Brazilian telenovelas
2016 Brazilian television series debuts
2016 Brazilian television series endings
Brazilian LGBT-related television shows
Television shows set in São Paulo
Telenovelas by Walcyr Carrasco
Portuguese-language telenovelas
Child abduction in television